Masella, belonging to Alp's municipality, is a ski resort in La Cerdanya in Girona, Catalunya in the Spanish Pyrenees. It is situated on Tosa d'Alp mountain. This ski resort is part of the Alp 2500 resort.

References

External links
The resort's website

Ski areas and resorts in Catalonia
Pyrenees